The North Hobart Football Club, nicknamed The Demons, is an Australian rules football club which plays in the Tasmanian State League. The club returned to the state league in 2018 after its position was effectively filled by a new club, the Hobart City Football Club after the 2013 season. The club (i.e. North Hobart) was part of the Tasmanian Football League from the early 1900s through to 2001, where the club joined Southern Football League. In 2009, the club was invited into the second reincarnation of the statewide league where it remained until 2013.

In 2014, the North Hobart Football Club Inc. changed from an incorporated body to a company limited with 100% ownership of the Hobart City Football Club, with the Hobart City Demons now the trading name of North Hobart Football Club Ltd.

On October 9, 2017 the paying members of the Hobart City Demons voted 371-118 in favour of returning the playing name of the club to the North Hobart identity for season 2018 and beyond.

Players to reach Australian Football League level include Paul Williams, Peter 'Percy' Jones, Daryn Cresswell, Chris Bond, James Manson, Jim Wright, Tony Pickett, Colin Garland and several other big names. In total 54 North Hobart players have moved on to play at VFL/AFL level.

In 2005, North Hobart was the first club inducted into the AFL Tasmania Hall of Fame as a Great Club.

Honours and achievements

Club achievements

Tasmanian Football League
 Premierships (27): 1902, 1905, 1908, 1914, 1920, 1923, 1928, 1929, 1932, 1934, 1936, 1938, 1939, 1940, 1941, 1945, 1947, 1957, 1961, 1962, 1967, 1969, 1974, 1987, 1989, 1991, 1992
 Runners-Up (17): 1896, 1897, 1912, 1921, 1922, 1925, 1930, 1931, 1933, 1935, 1937, 1948, 1951, 1956, 1960, 1965, 1968
Southern Football League (Tasmania)
Premierships (1): 2003
 Runners-Up (2): 2002, 2008
 Women’s Premierships (1): 2022
Tasmanian State Premierships (12): 1914, 1920, 1923, 1929, 1936, 1939, 1940, 1941, 1945, 1961, 1962, 1969

Individual awards
William Leitch Medallists
 1932 – Len Pye
 1934 – S. Sproule
 1945 – E. Reid
 1977 – Mick Hawkins
 1993 – Darren Perry
 1994 – Michael Maple
 2003 – Brendon Bolton

George Watt Medallists
 1954 – M. Cleary
 1955 – A. Petersen
 1957 – A. Gould (tied)
 1958 – R. Large
 1959 – S. Graham
 1960 – K. Turner
 1962 – Bruce Felmingham
 1966 – W. Patmore
 1968 – A. Patmore (tied)
 1984 – Victor Di Venuto
 1985 – Tony Kline
 1993 – Ricky Darley
 1995 – Jeremy Busch
 2002 – Richard Robinson
 2007 – Michael Hall

V. A. Geard Medallists
 1968 – A. Caudwell (tied)
 1972 – Leigh McConnan (tied)

D. R. Plaister Medallists
 1979 – Gary Webster

TFL Leading Goalkicker Award

 1903 – A. Walton – 18
 1905 – T. Mills – 15
 1906 – T. Mills – 13
 1907 – W. Lee – 14
 1908 – FiG. Cook – 24
 1914 – S. Russell – 26
 1920 – W. Jack – 25
 1923 – L. Stevens – 26
 1929 – Alan Rait – 92
 1930 – Alan Rait – 112
 1931 – Alan Rait – 85
 1932 – Alan Rait – 102
 1935 – Alan Rait – 84
 1936 – Alan Rait – 98
 1937 – Alan Rait – 62
 1938 – T. Richardson – 75
 1939 – Jack Metherell – 61
 1940 – Jack Metherell – 69
 1941 – Jack Metherell – 64
 1945 – Ted Collis – 54
 1956 – Noel Clarke – 80
 1958 – Paddy Cooper – 45
 1961 – Noel Clarke – 74
 1962 – David Collins – 77
 1967 – David Collins – 58
 1982 – Brett Stephens – 92
 1987 - Steve McQueen – 80 (Joint winner)
 1992 – Byron Howard – 92
 1995 – Byron Howard – 104
 1997 – Byron Howard – 70

Southern Football League Leading Goalkicker

 2001 – Robert Devine – 102
 2002 – Robert Devine – 60
 2008 – Robert Devine – 82

Individual records 
Most Senior games

 268 – Don McLeod (1972–1986)
264 - Robert Devine (1997 - 2010)

Most overall games

 341 - Robert Devine (264 senior games)

Most Goals:

 689 - Alan Rait
651 - Robert Devine

Club records 
Club Record Attendance

 19,425 – North Hobart 19.15 (129) v Clarence 17.15 (117) – 1969 TFL Grand Final at North Hobart Oval

Club Record Score

TFL 37.24 (246) vs. South Launceston 2.5 (17) in 1991 at North Hobart Oval

Senior Coaches 

1911 – George Morrissey
1912-1913 – Edward Russell
1914-1915 – Charlie Dunn
1919 – Edward Russell
1920 – Charlie Dunn
1921 – Joe Rutter
1922 – Jack Dunn
1923 – Percy Martyn
1924 – Les Stevens & Jack Gardiner
1925 – Jack Gardiner
1926 – Fred Williams & Jack Gardiner
1927 – Fred Mutch
1928-1929 – Jack Dunn
1930 – Alby Bonnitcha & Jack Dunn
1931 – Bruce McGregor
1932-1933 – Roy Cazaly
1934 – Len Pitchford
1935 – Alan Rait
1936-1937 – Cecil Pettiona
1938-1941 & 1945 – Jack Metherell
1946 – Arthur O'Brien & Dinny Kelleher
1947-1948 – Jack Metherell
1949 – Roy Quinn
1950 – Vern Rae
1951-1953 – Les McCankie
1954-1959 – John Leedham
1960-1964 – Darrell Eaton
1964 – Max Kelleher & Byron Howard Snr
1965-1966 – Dick Grimmond
1967-1971 – John Devine
1972-1973 – Vin Crowe
1974-1975 – John Devine
1976 – Ross Price
1977-1978 – Ian Bremner
1979-1980 – John Chick
1981 – John Devine
1982-1983 – John Thurley
1984-1986 – Darryl Sutton
1987-1989 – Garry Davidson
1990 – Roland Crosby
1991-1992 – Mark Yeates
1993-1994 – Andy Bennett
1995-1996 – Ricky Hanlon
1997-1998 – John McCarthy
1999 – Darryn Perry
2000 – Darren Trevena
2001-2002 – Steven Bozicevic
2003-2005 – Brendon Bolton
2006-2007 – Brent Williams
2008-2009 – Matthew Geappen
2010-2011 – Clinton Brown
2011-2013 – Lance Spaulding
2014-2015 - Michael McGregor
2016-2017 - Kane Richter
2018-2020 - Richard Robinson
2021-Present - Clinton French

Famous Matches

1967 Grand Finals 
In 1967 TANFL Season North Hobart went on to win the premiership after winning just once in their first eight games of the season. The team won nine of their last 11 games to finish fourth on the ladder, before going on to beat New Norfolk  by 5 points in the Semi-Final, followed by a 9 point victory over an inaccurate Clarence team in the preliminary final. The team then went on the beat Glenorchy by 14 points in front of 17,523 in the TANFL Grand Final.    

1967 TANFL Grand Final

Glenorchy      2.5   2.12   3.13   8.16  (64)

North Hobart  3.3   6.5    9.8    11.12  (78)

Result: North Hobart won by 14 points  

After winning the TANFL Premiership, the club qualified to compete against NWFU Premiers Wynyard in the 1967 Tasmanian State Premiership Final at West Park Oval in Burnie. The match turned out to be one of the most controversial is Tasmanian football history.    

1967 Tasmanian State Premiership Final  

Wynard          1.1   9.7   10.9    13.14   (92)  

North Hobart  3.8  5.11  11.17  12.19   (91)

Result: No Result

One of the most controversial games in Australian rules football history, the match was declared no result and the premiership was withheld after fans invaded the field and eventually took down the goal posts, preventing North Hobart full-forward David Collins from taking a kick after the siren which would likely have won or tied the game for North Hobart.

References

External links

Official website
Official Facebook

Australian rules football clubs in Tasmania
Australian rules football clubs established in 1881
1881 establishments in Australia
Sport in Hobart
Tasmanian Football League clubs
North Hobart, Tasmania